Mestrino is a comune (municipality) in the Province of Padua in the Italian region Veneto, located about  west of Venice and about  northwest of Padua.
Since the 13th of October 2020 there’s an Amazon Locker at Piazzo Strumenti Musicali.

The municipality of Mestrino contains the frazioni (subdivisions, mainly villages and hamlets) Arlesega and Lissaro.

Mestrino borders the following municipalities: Campodoro, Grisignano di Zocco, Rubano, Saccolongo, Veggiano, Villafranca Padovana.

Demographic evolution

References

External links
 www.comuneweb.it/MestrinoHome/shared/contenuto.phtml
 www.arlesega.it

Cities and towns in Veneto